Ross Tompkins (May 13, 1938 – June 30, 2006) was an American jazz pianist who was a member of The Tonight Show Band.

Biography
Tompkins attended the New England Conservatory of Music, then moved to New York City, where he worked with Kai Winding (1960–67), Eric Dolphy (1964), Wes Montgomery (1966), Bob Brookmeyer/Clark Terry (1966), Benny Goodman (1968), Bobby Hackett (1965–70), and Al Cohn and Zoot Sims (1968–72). He moved to Los Angeles in 1971, playing with Louie Bellson, Joe Venuti, and Red Norvo in the 1970s and Jack Sheldon in the 1980s.

He was best known for his longtime association with The Tonight Show Band, led by Doc Severinsen, on the television program The Tonight Show Starring Johnny Carson. He was a member of the band from 1971 until Carson's retirement in 1992. He recorded for Concord Jazz as a leader in the second half of the 1970s.

Tompkins died of lung cancer at the age of 68.

Discography

As leader
 A Pair to Draw To (Concord Jazz, 1975)
 Scrimshaw (Concord, 1976)
 Live at Concord 1977 (Concord, 1977)
 Lost in the Stars (Concord, 1977)
 Ross Tompkins and Good Friends (Concord, 1978)
 Festival Time (Concord, 1979)
 Street of Dreams (Famous Door, 1982)
 Solo Piano (Progressive, 1994)
 Celebrates the Music of Jule Styne (Progressive, 1996)
 Heart to Heart  (HD, 1998) with Cathy Segal-Garcia
 Ross Tompkins Celebrates the Music of Harold Arlen (Progressive, 1999)
 Younger than Springtime (Arbors, 2001)

As sideman
With Kai Winding
 The Great Kai & J. J. (1960)
 The Incredible Kai Winding Trombones (Impulse!, 1960)
 Kai Olé (Verve, 1961)
 Solo (Verve, 1963)
 Israel (A&M/CTI, 1968) with J. J. Johnson
 Stonebone (A&M/CTI (Japan), 1969) with J. J. Johnson

With Doc Severinsen
 1970 Doc Severinsen's Closet
 1986 The Tonight Show Band Vol. 1
 1988 The Tonight Show Band Vol. 2
 1991 Merry Christmas from Doc Severinsen
 1991 Once More...With Feeling!
 1992 Good Medicine
 1999 Swingin' the Blues

With Tommy Newsom
 1991 Tommy Newsom and His TV Jazz Stars
 1996 I Remember You Johnny

With Louie Bellson
 1974 150 MPH
 1975 The Louis Bellson Explosion
 1976 Louie Bellson's 7
 1978 Louis Bellson Jam
 1978 Matterhorn
 1978 Prime Time
 1978 Raincheck
 1978 Sunshine Rock
 1995 Live at Concord Summer Festival
 1994 Cool Cool Blue

With Herb Ellis
 1975 A Pair to Draw To
 1975 Rhythm Willie
 1979 Soft & Mellow
 1979 Herb Ellis at Montreux

With Snooky Young
 Snooky & Marshall's Album (1978)
 Horn of Plenty (Concord Jazz, 1979) with John Collins, Ray Brown, and Jake Hanna.

With Bill Watrous
 1980 I'll Play for You
 2001 Bill Watrous & Carl Fontana

With Jack Sheldon
 1983 Stand by for Jack Sheldon
 1991 On My Own

With others
 1962 In a Mellow Mood, Joe Newman
 1968 Warm Wild & Wonderful, Tony Mottola
 1976 Hawthorne Nights, Zoot Sims
 1977 The Real Howard Roberts, Howard Roberts
 1978 Sweet Lorraine, Lorraine Feather
 1979 Peanuts Hucko with His Pied Piper Quintet, Peanuts Hucko
 1979 Red and Ross, Red Norvo
 1980 Play the Music of Michel LeGrand, Bob Cooper
 1981 California Doings, Dick Cary
 1988 Just a Bit o' Blues Vol. 1, Spike Robinson
 1988 Just a Bit o' Blues Vol. 2, Harry Edison/Spike Robinson
 1990 Doug MacDonald Quartet, Doug MacDonald
 1990 Piano & Vocals, Jack Lemmon
 1993 Bob Cooper/Conte Candoli Quintet, Bob Cooper & Conte Candoli
 1994 Don't You Know I Care?, Polly Podewell
 1994 Prez Impressions, Dick Hafer
 1999 Evening Delight, Plas Johnson
 2001 Live in Paradise, Dave Pell

References
Footnotes

Further Reading
Paul Rinzler, "Ross Tompkins". The New Grove Dictionary of Jazz. 2nd edition, 2001, ed. Barry Kernfeld.
Richard S. Ginell, [ Ross Tompkins] at Allmusic

External links

1938 births
2006 deaths
Deaths from lung cancer
American jazz pianists
American male pianists
Jazz musicians from Michigan
Concord Records artists
20th-century American pianists
20th-century American male musicians
American male jazz musicians
The Tonight Show Band members
Arbors Records artists